Negra Muerta may refer to:
Negra Muerta volcanic complex
Iturbe, Jujuy